Pedro Manuel Brito da Silva Girão, (born 27 February 1952) is a Portuguese engineer, professor, and researcher whose main interest is metrology.

Family
Pedro Silva Girão was born in Lisbon, Portugal, as the youngest of four sons of José da Silva Girão Júnior (1904-1978) and Arlete de Oliveira Brito da Silva Girão (1912-1993). His elder brother, José António Brito da Silva Girão (born 1938), holds a PhD in economy. His two sisters, Maria Teresa Brito da Silva Girão Sampaio Soares (born 1939) and Maria Margarida Brito da Silva Girão (born 1945) have degrees in social service and psychology, respectively.

Pedro Silva Girão is married to Cornelia Silva Girão (born in 1957), who has a degree in Automation and Computer Engineering from the Technical University Gheorghe Asachi of Iași, Iași, Romania.

Academic degrees
Pedro Silva Girão has a degree in electrical engineering (1975) from Instituto Superior Técnico (IST) of the former Technical University of Lisbon, now University of Lisbon. In 1988, he earned a PhD in electrical and computer engineering from the same school. In 1995, he received from IST the title Agregação (Habilitation), also in electrical and computer engineering.

Professional activity

Teaching
Pedro Silva Girão has been with the Department of Electrical and Computer Engineering (DEEC) of IST since 1974, first as a monitor (1974-1975) and, from 2007, as a full professor. At IST, he has taught courses on applied electromagnetism, electronics, electrical measurements, sensors and transducers, and automated measuring systems for undergraduate and graduate students.

Since 1993, he has been lecturing a course on technology and electrical measurements at Escola Naval.

Research
Pedro Silva Girão started his research activity in 1975 at the now extinguished Centro de Electrotecnia da Universidade Técnica de Lisboa (1975-1994) and later at Centro de Electrotecnia Teórica e Medidas Eléctricas do Instituto Superior Técnico (1994-1998).

In 1997, he integrated a group that created the Instrumentation and Measurement Group (GIM) at Instituto de Telecomunicações (IT). At IT, where he is a Senior Researcher, he leads the GIM, and coordinates, with Prof. Luís Alcácer, the Basic Sciences and Enabling Technologies Scientific Area.

In the broad domain of metrology, his main interests include instrumentation, transducers, measurement techniques, and digital data processing, particularly for biomedical and environmental applications. Metrology, quality, and electromagnetic compatibility are also areas of regular activity.

Other interests

Maria Inês de Menezes Vaz de Sampaio Foundation
He is the President of Maria Inês de Menezes Vaz de Sampaio Foundation. The Foundation, created by Dr. Victor Hugo Traveiro Franco in honour of his wife, is a non-for-profit institution that helps financially needy students of high performance by granting scholarships that enable them the frequency of pre-defined university courses.

Sports
Passionate about all sports, Pedro Silva Girão practiced several of them as an amateur: football, handball (he was in the team that won the 1988 Portuguese Army Championship and was runner-up at the 1988 Portuguese Armed Forced Championship), basketball, volleyball, table tennis, skiing, snowboarding, surfing, windsurfing, kitesurfing, and tennis.

He started playing bridge in the early 1970s. Dedicated to the game for more than 20 years, he won tens of national events, with emphasis on the Portuguese National Pairs Championship in 1983-1984 (with António Santos Serra), a Portuguese National Teams Championship  (with António Santos Serra, Manuel d'Orey Capucho, Nuno Guimarães, José Miguel Saraiva, and António Oliveira Monteiro), and in 1984-1985 (with Jorge Monteiro dos Santos, José Galvão Lucas, Francisco Costa Cabral, Rui Silva Santos, and António Santos Serra). He played for Portugal in the 4th European Youth Championships 1974, Copenhagen, Denmark (with António Oliveira Monteiro, Luís Folque, Carlos Galvão Lucas, José Galvão Lucas, and António Vitória Lopes) and in the 6th World Bridge Olympiad 1980, Valkenburg, Netherlands (with Jorge Monteiro dos Santos, Rui Silva Santos, Miguel Ascenção, Manuel Oliveira, and António Santos Serra).

He was a member of the Direction of Clube de Ténis do Estoril (Estoril Tennis Club) and of Federação Portuguesa de Bridge (Portuguese Bridge Federation).

References

1952 births
Living people
Technical University of Lisbon alumni
Portuguese engineers
Academic staff of the Technical University of Lisbon